The 2010 Los Angeles Angels of Anaheim season is the franchise's 50th season and 45th in Anaheim. The Angels began this season as the three-time defending American League West division champions. During the 2010 season, the Angels hosted the MLB All-Star Game at Angel Stadium for the third time in franchise history.

2009–2010 Offseason
The Los Angeles Angels of Anaheim had to address four vital free agencies going into the offseason, with right fielder Bobby Abreu, ace John Lackey, leadoff third baseman Chone Figgins and aging slugger Vladimir Guerrero all entering free agency. The offseason challenge for the Angels was one of the toughest in baseball with ESPN saying one of the top ten offseason questions was "Will the Angels be able to keep their team together?"

Going into the postseason Angels trimmed roughly $51 million off their payroll with many of the teams highly paid stars becoming free agents: Vladimir Guerrero, Kelvim Escobar, John Lackey, Bobby Abreu, Chone Figgins, Darren Oliver and Robb Quinlan. However, the Angels also had eight player going into salary arbitration: pitchers Jered Weaver and Joe Saunders, catchers Mike Napoli and Jeff Mathis, infielders Erick Aybar, Maicer Izturis and Howie Kendrick and outfielder Reggie Willits.

On November 5, 2009, the first day eligible players could file for free agency, the Angels signed Bobby Abreu to a two-year deal, with a club option for 2012. Soon after, general manager Tony Reagins stated the team's focus was on re-signing Lackey and Figgins.  A few days later, owner Arte Moreno added he wanted to retain both Lackey and Figgins, but with limited payroll options, would have to choose just one of the two stars. "If you look at what they're asking, you can't bring both of them back", Moreno said. Negotiations with Guerrero also stalled, as Moreno added, "We've talked to his agent just recently. We talked to his agent two years ago. We could never get close enough. It's very emotional for us."

After signing Abreu, Los Angeles Times reporter Mike DiGiovanna estimated that GM Tony Reagins had roughly $12 million to spend to keep payroll at the same level as the previous year. With about $12 million to work with, Reagins said."We do have money available to be active in free agency, and there are some areas we can work with that will give us more flexibility. We feel we can take on some payroll, but we're going to have to be creative."

The Angels offered arbitration to both Lackey and Figgins on December 2, but not to 39-year-old Darren Oliver, who had just come off a surprisingly good season, enough to earn him Elias Sports Bureau ranking as a Type A Free Agent. This move assured the Angels of receiving first-round draft picks should Lackey or Figgins decided to sign elsewhere.

On December 8, Figgins finalized a deal with division rival the Seattle Mariners. Sports Illustrated's Cliff Corcoran said the Mariners "might have actually done the Angels a favor" by providing an opening for prospect Brandon Wood to assume third base and free up money to re-sign ace starter John Lackey. The Los Angeles Times reported that the Angels' "reluctance to add a fourth year to their offer was a huge factor in the infielder's decision to sign with Seattle." Because of Figgins' status as a Type A Free Agent, the Angels received a compensatory draft pick from the Mariners.

The Angels appeared to shift their primary focus on re-signing Lackey or trade for starting pitcher, with many rumors swirling around Toronto Blue Jays ace Roy Halladay. While the Angels were considered a front-runner to sign power hitting left fielder Jason Bay, manager Mike Scoscia told the media he would prefer to make a long-term investment in pitching instead of his offense."I don't think you can ever have too much pitching", Scioscia said. "So if you are going to make a financial commitment, certainly the pitching end of it is something you're going to consider." While Lackey's free agency lingered, the Angels were rumored to have offered Toronto left-handed starter Joe Saunders, shortstop Erick Aybar and outfield prospect Peter Bourjos in exchange for Toronto ace Roy Halladay. However, when Angels GM Tony Reagins was asked about the rumored trade, he had 'no reaction', adding, "It's not worth commenting on. A lot of things get thrown around and aren't accurate."  Yet, a few days later on December 14, 2009, sources indicated that Halladay would sign with the Philadelphia Phillies in a trade sending Cliff Lee to the Mariners, and that Lackey would sign with the Boston Red Sox.

Later, Moreno told the Los Angeles Times that the decision not to bid higher for Figgins and Lackey wasn't based on money 'but on age and contract length, concerns about their long-term health and the availability of cheaper but attractive alternatives.'

On the same day however, sources indicated that the Angels had signed Japanese slugger Hideki Matsui to a $6.5 million one-year contract. Matsui would likely only hit as Designated Hitter because of his weak knees, filling the role for the former slugger Vladimir Guerrero, who both manager Scoscia and GM Reagins confirmed wouldn't come back after the signing of Matsui.

The Angels bullpen also saw turnover. On December 12, the Angels announced they would not offer reliever José Arredondo a contract after learning he would undergo elbow reconstruction and be unavailable in the 2010 season. Soon after, on December 22, veteran reliever Darren Oliver signed with division rival Texas Rangers. The Angels signed closer Fernando Rodney as a possible setup man or as an alternative closer for the Brian Fuentes.

Regular season

Season standings

Record vs. opponents

Game log

|- align="center" bgcolor="bbffbb"
| 1 || April 5 || Twins || 6–3 || Weaver (1–0) || Baker (0–1) || Fuentes (1) || 43,504 || 1–0 || Angel Stadium of Anaheim || W1 || bgcolor="f2f2f2" | 0 
|- align="center" bgcolor="#ffbbbb"
| 2 || April 6 || Twins || 5–3 || Blackburn (1–0) || Saunders (0–1) || Rauch (1) || 43,510 || 1–1 || Angel Stadium of Anaheim || L1 || bgcolor="ffbbbb" | −
|- align="center" bgcolor="#ffbbbb"
| 3 || April 7 || Twins || 4–2 || Pavano (1–0) || Santana (0–1) || Rauch (2) || 41,533 || 1–2 || Angel Stadium of Anaheim || L2 || bgcolor="ffbbbb" | −1
|- align="center" bgcolor="#ffbbbb"
| 4 || April 8 || Twins || 10–1 || Slowey (1–0) || Piñeiro (0–1) ||  || 39,709 || 1–3 || Angel Stadium of Anaheim || L3 || bgcolor="ffbbbb" | −2
|- align="center" bgcolor="#ffbbbb"
| 5 || April 9 || Athletics || 10–4 || Gonzalez (1–0) || Palmer (0–1) ||  || 40,034 || 1–4 || Angel Stadium of Anaheim || L4 || bgcolor="ffbbbb" | −3
|- align="center" bgcolor="bbffbb"
| 6 || April 10 || Athletics || 4–3 || Rodney (1–0) || Breslow (0–1) ||  || 40,249 || 2–4 || Angel Stadium of Anaheim || W1 || bgcolor="ffbbbb" | −2
|- align="center" bgcolor="#ffbbbb"
| 7 || April 11 || Athletics || 9–4 || Braden (1–0) || Saunders (0–2) || Ross (1) || 40,601 || 2–5 || Angel Stadium of Anaheim || L1 || bgcolor="ffbbbb" | −3
|- align="center" bgcolor="#ffbbbb"
| 8 || April 13 || @ Yankees || 7–5 || Pettitte (1–0) || Santana (0–2) || Rivera (3) || 49,293 || 2–6 || Yankee Stadium || L2 || bgcolor="ffbbbb" | −
|- align="center" bgcolor="bbffbb"
| 9 || April 14 || @ Yankees || 5–3 || Piñeiro (1–1) || Vázquez (0–2) || Rodney (1) || 42,372 || 3–6 || Yankee Stadium || W1 || bgcolor="ffbbbb" | −
|- align="center" bgcolor="#ffbbbb"
| 10 || April 15 || @ Yankees || 6–2 || Hughes (1–0) || Kazmir (0–1) || Rivera (4) || 44,722 || 3–7 || Yankee Stadium || L1 || bgcolor="ffbbbb" | −
|- align="center" bgcolor="bbffbb"
| 11 || April 16 || @ Blue Jays || 7–5  || Weaver (2–0) || Marcum (0–1) || Rodney (2) || 14,779 || 4–7 || Rogers Centre || W1 || bgcolor="ffbbbb" | −
|- align="center" bgcolor="bbffbb"
| 12 || April 17 || @ Blue Jays || 6–2 || Saunders (1–2) || Tallet (1–1) || Rodney (3) || 17,187 || 5–7 || Rogers Centre || W2 || bgcolor="ffbbbb" | −
|- align="center" bgcolor="bbffbb"
| 13 || April 18 || @ Blue Jays || 3–1 || Santana (1–2) || Romero (1–1) ||  || 14,246 || 6–7 || Rogers Centre || W3 || bgcolor="ffbbbb" | −
|- align="center" bgcolor="bbffbb"
| 14 || April 19 || Tigers || 2–0 || Piñeiro (2–1) || Willis (0–1) || Rodney (4) || 36,006 || 7–7 || Angel Stadium of Anaheim || W4 || bgcolor="ffbbbb" | −2
|- align="center" bgcolor="bbffbb"
| 15 || April 20 || Tigers || 6–5 || Kazmir (1–1) || Porcello (1–1) || Rodney (5) || 35,266 || 8–7 || Angel Stadium of Anaheim || W5 || bgcolor="ffbbbb" | −1
|- align="center" bgcolor="#ffbbbb"
| 16 || April 21 || Tigers || 4–3 || Coke (2–0) || Fuentes (0–1) || Valverde (4) || 35,279 || 8–8 || Angel Stadium of Anaheim || L1 || bgcolor="ffbbbb" | −1
|- align="center" bgcolor="#ffbbbb"
| 17 || April 22 || Tigers || 5–4 || Verlander (1–1) || Saunders (1–3) || Valverde (5) || 37,338 || 8–9 || Angel Stadium of Anaheim || L2 || bgcolor="ffbbbb" | −2
|- align="center" bgcolor="bbffbb"
| 18 || April 23 || Yankees || 6–4 || Rodney (2–0) || Chamberlain (0–1) || Fuentes (2) || 44,002 || 9–9 || Angel Stadium of Anaheim || W1 || bgcolor="ffbbbb" | −2
|- align="center" bgcolor="#ffbbbb"
| 19 || April 24 || Yankees || 7–1 || Pettitte (3–0) || Piñeiro (2–2) || || 43,390 || 9–10 || Angel Stadium of Anaheim || L1 || bgcolor="ffbbbb" | −2
|- align="center" bgcolor="bbffbb"
| 20 || April 25 || Yankees || 8–4 || Kazmir (2–1) || Vázquez (1–3)  || || 42,284 || 10–10 || Angel Stadium of Anaheim || W1 || bgcolor="ffbbbb" | −2
|- align="center" bgcolor="bbffbb"
| 21 || April 26 || Indians || 5–2 || Weaver (3–0) || Huff (1–3) || Fuentes (3) || 34,837 || 11–10 || Angel Stadium of Anaheim || W2 || bgcolor="ffbbbb" | −
|- align="center" bgcolor="#ffbbbb"
| 22 || April 27 || Indians || 9–2 || Talbot (3–1) || Saunders (1–4) ||  || 39,619 || 11–11 || Angel Stadium of Anaheim || L1 || bgcolor="ffbbbb" | −
|- align="center" bgcolor="bbffbb"
| 23 || April 28 || Indians || 4–3 || Fuentes (1–1) || Smith (0–1) ||  || 34,190 || 12–11 || Angel Stadium of Anaheim || W1 || bgcolor="ffbbbb" | −
|- align="center" bgcolor="#ffbbbb"
| 24 || April 30 || @ Tigers || 10–6 || Porcello (2–2) || Piñeiro (2–3) || || 31,725 || 12–12 || Comerica Park || L1 || bgcolor="f2f2f2" | 0
|- 

|- align="center" bgcolor="#ffbbbb"
| 25 || May 1 || @ Tigers || 3–2 || Perry (1–1) || Shields (0–1) || || 31,042 || 12–13 || Comerica Park || L2 || bgcolor="ffbbbb" | −1
|- align="center" bgcolor="#ffbbbb"
| 26 || May 2 || @ Tigers || 5–1 || Verlander (2–2) || Weaver (3–1) || || 25,603 || 12–14 || Comerica Park || L3 || bgcolor="ffbbbb" | −
|- align="center" bgcolor="#ffbbbb"
| 27 || May 3 || @ Red Sox || 17–8 || Buchholz (3–2) || Saunders (1–5) || || 37,404 || 12–15 || Fenway Park || L4 || bgcolor="ffbbbb" | −
|- align="center" bgcolor="#ffbbbb"
| 28 || May 4 || @ Red Sox || 5–1 || Lester (2–2) || Jepsen (0–1) || || 37,411 || 12–16 || Fenway Park || L5 || bgcolor="ffbbbb" | −
|- align="center" bgcolor="#ffbbbb"
| 29 || May 5 || @ Red Sox || 3–1 || Lackey (3–1) || Piñeiro (2–4) || Papelbon (8) || 37,601 || 12–17 || Fenway Park || L6 || bgcolor="ffbbbb" | −3
|- align="center" bgcolor="#ffbbbb"
| 30 || May 6 || @ Red Sox || 11–6 || Matsuzaka (1–1) || Kazmir (2–2) || || 37,639 || 12–18 || Fenway Park || L7 || bgcolor="ffbbbb" | −
|- align="center" bgcolor="bbffbb"
| 31 || May 7 || @ Mariners || 8–0 || Weaver (4–1) || Hernández (2–3) || || 37,602 || 13–18 || Safeco Field || W1 || bgcolor="ffbbbb" | −
|- align="center" bgcolor="bbffbb"
| 32 || May 8 || @ Mariners || 4–3 (10) || Rodney (3–0) || Aardsma (0–2) || Fuentes (4) || 30,446 || 14–18 || Safeco Field || W2 || bgcolor="ffbbbb" | −
|- align="center" bgcolor="#ffbbbb"
| 33 || May 9 || @ Mariners || 8–1 || Vargas (3–2) || Santana (1–3) ||  || 28,668 || 14–19 || Safeco Field || L1 || bgcolor="ffbbbb" | −
|- align="center" bgcolor="bbffbb"
| 34 || May 10 || Rays || 5–4 (11) || Bell (1–0) || Balfour (0–1) ||  || 36,798 || 15–19 || Angel Stadium of Anaheim || W1 || bgcolor="ffbbbb" | −4
|- align="center" bgcolor="#ffbbbb"
| 35 || May 11 || Rays || 7–2 || Niemann (3–0) || Kazmir (2–3) ||  || 39,007 || 15–20 || Angel Stadium of Anaheim || L1 || bgcolor="ffbbbb" | −4
|- align="center" bgcolor="#ffbbbb"
| 36 || May 12 || Rays || 4–3 || Price (5–1) || Weaver (4–2) || Soriano (9) || 35,700 || 15–21 || Angel Stadium of Anaheim || L2 || bgcolor="ffbbbb" | −5
|- align="center" bgcolor="bbffbb"
| 37 || May 14 || Athletics || 4–0 || Saunders (2–5) || Braden (4–3) || || 41,290 || 16–21 || Angel Stadium of Anaheim || W1 || bgcolor="ffbbbb" | −
|- align="center" bgcolor="bbffbb"
| 38 || May 15 || Athletics || 12–3 || Santana (2–3) || Ross (1–1) ||  || 41,744 || 17–21 || Angel Stadium of Anaheim || W2 || bgcolor="ffbbbb" | −
|- align="center" bgcolor="bbffbb"
| 39 || May 16 || Athletics || 4–0 || Piñeiro (3–4) || Cahill (1–2) ||  || 41,569 || 18–21 || Angel Stadium of Anaheim || W3 || bgcolor="ffbbbb" | −
|- align="center" bgcolor="#ffbbbb"
| 40 || May 17 || @ Rangers || 4–3 || Holland (2–0) || Kazmir (2–4) || Feliz (10) || 20,210 || 18–22 || Rangers Ballpark in Arlington || L1 || bgcolor="ffbbbb" | −
|- align="center" bgcolor="#ffbbbb"
| 41 || May 18 || @ Rangers || 8–7 || O'Day (1–1) || Bell (1–1) || Feliz (11) || 22,358 || 18–23 || Rangers Ballpark in Arlington || L2 || bgcolor="ffbbbb" | −
|- align="center" bgcolor="bbffbb"  
| 42 || May 19 || @ White Sox || 3–2 || Saunders (3–5) || Danks (3–3) || Fuentes (5) || 23,271 || 19–23 || U.S. Cellular Field || W1 || bgcolor="ffbbbb" | −
|- align="center" bgcolor="bbffbb"
| 43 || May 20 || @ White Sox || 6–5 || Santana (3–3) || Peavy (3–3) || Fuentes (6) || 23,515 || 20–23 || U.S. Cellular Field || W2 || bgcolor="ffbbbb" | −
|- align="center" bgcolor="#ffbbbb"
| 44 || May 21 || @ Cardinals || 9–5 || Motte (2–1) || Piñeiro (3–5) ||  || 44,111 || 20–24 || Busch Stadium || L1 || bgcolor="ffbbbb" | −
|- align="center" bgcolor="bbffbb"
| 45 || May 22 || @ Cardinals || 10–7 || Kazmir (3–4) || Lohse (1–4) ||  || 44,091 || 21–24 || Busch Stadium || W1 || bgcolor="ffbbbb" | −
|- align="center" bgcolor="#ffbbbb"
| 46 || May 23 || @ Cardinals || 6–5 || Franklin (3–0) || Shields (0–2) ||  || 42,417 || 21– 25|| Busch Stadium || L1 || bgcolor="ffbbbb" | −
|- align="center" bgcolor="#ffbbbb"
| 47 || May 24 || Blue Jays || 6–0 || Cecil (4–2) || Saunders (3–6) ||  || 35,826 || 21–26 || Angel Stadium of Anaheim || L2 || bgcolor="ffbbbb" | −5
|- align="center" bgcolor="bbffbb"
| 48 || May 25 || Blue Jays || 8–3 || Santana (4–3) || Romero  (4–2) ||  || 43,174 || 22–26 || Angel Stadium of Anaheim || W1 || bgcolor="ffbbbb" | −5
|- align="center" bgcolor="bbffbb"
| 49 || May 26 || Blue Jays || 6–5 || Fuentes (2–1) || Downs (1–4) || || 34,504 || 23–26 || Angel Stadium of Anaheim || W2 || bgcolor="ffbbbb" | −4
|- align="center" bgcolor="#ffbbbb"
| 50 || May 28 || Mariners || 8–3  || Lee (3–2) || Kazmir (3–5) || || 41,770 || 23–27 || Angel Stadium of Anaheim || L1 || bgcolor="ffbbbb" | −4
|- align="center" bgcolor="bbffbb"
| 51 || May 29 || Mariners || 5–1 (10) || Fuentes (3–1) || League (4–5) || || 39,382 || 24–27 || Angel Stadium of Anaheim || W1 || bgcolor="ffbbbb" | −
|- align="center" bgcolor="bbffbb"
| 52 || May 30 || Mariners || 9–7  ||  Rodney (4–0) || Aardsma (0–3) || || 40,017 || 25–27 || Angel Stadium of Anaheim || W2 || bgcolor="ffbbbb" | −
|- align="center" bgcolor="bbffbb"
| 53 || May 31 || @ Royals || 7–1 || Santana (5–3) || Hochevar (5–3) || || 24,651 || 26–27 || Kauffman Stadium || W3 || bgcolor="ffbbbb" | −
|- 

|- align="center" bgcolor="#ffbbbb"
| 54 || June 1 || @ Royals || 6–3 || Bannister (5–3) || Piñeiro (3–6) || Soria (13) || 15,139 || 26–28 || Kauffman Stadium || L1 || bgcolor="ffbbbb" | −
|- align="center" bgcolor="bbffbb"
| 55 || June 2 || @ Royals || 7–2  || Kazmir (4–5) || Davies (4–4) ||  || 12,718 || 27–28 || Kauffman Stadium || W1 || bgcolor="ffbbbb" | −
|- align="center" bgcolor="bbffbb"
| 56 || June 3 || @ Royals || 5–4 || Weaver (5–2) || Greinke (1–7) || Fuentes (7) || 13,621 || 28–28 || Kauffman Stadium || W2 || bgcolor="ffbbbb" | −
|- align="center" bgcolor="bbffbb"
| 57 || June 4 || @ Mariners || 7–1 || Saunders (4–6) || Snell (0–4) ||  || 29,230 || 29–28 || Safeco Field || W3 || bgcolor="ffbbbb" | −
|- align="center" bgcolor="bbffbb"
| 58 || June 5 || @ Mariners || 11–2 || Santana (6–3) || Olson (0–1) ||  || 31,548 || 30–28 || Safeco Field || W4 || bgcolor="ffbbbb" | −
|- align="center" bgcolor="bbffbb"
| 59 || June 6 || @ Mariners || 9–4 || Piñeiro (4–6) || Kelley (3–1) ||  || 33,076 || 31–28 || Safeco Field || W5 || bgcolor="ffbbbb" | −
|- align="center" bgcolor="bbffbb"
| 60 || June 7 || @ Athletics || 4–2 || Kazmir (5–5) || Sheets (2–5) || Fuentes (8) || 10,071 || 32–28 || Oakland-Alameda Coliseum || W6 || bgcolor="bbffbb" | +
|- align="center" bgcolor="#ffbbbb"
| 61 || June 8 || @ Athletics || 10–1  || Mazzaro (2–0) || Weaver (5–3) || || 11,860 || 32–29 || Oakland-Alameda Coliseum || L1 || bgcolor="ffbbbb" | −
|- align="center" bgcolor="bbffbb"
| 62 || June 9 || @ Athletics || 7–1  || Saunders (5–6) || Braden (4–6) || || 18,285 || 33–29 || Oakland-Alameda Coliseum || W1 || bgcolor="ffbbbb" | −
|- align="center" bgcolor="#ffbbbb"
| 63 || June 10 || @ Athletics || 6–1 || Cahill (5–2) || Santana (6–4) || || 12,328 || 33–30 || Oakland-Alameda Coliseum || L1 || bgcolor="ffbbbb" | −
|- align="center" bgcolor="bbffbb"
| 64 || June 11 || @ Dodgers || 10–1 || Piñeiro (5–6) || Billingsley (6–4) || || 52,407 || 34–30 || Dodger Stadium || W1 || bgcolor="ffbbbb" | −
|- align="center" bgcolor="bbffbb"
| 65 || June 12 || @ Dodgers || 4–2 || Kazmir (6–5) || Ely (3–3) || Fuentes (9) || 52,806 || 35–30 || Dodger Stadium || W2 || bgcolor="ffbbbb" | −
|- align="center" bgcolor="bbffbb"
| 66 || June 13 || @ Dodgers || 6–5 || Weaver (6–3) || Monasterios (3–1) || Fuentes (10) || 52,776 || 36–30 || Dodger Stadium || W3 || bgcolor="ffbbbb" | −
|- align="center" bgcolor="#ffbbbb"
| 67 || June 14 || Brewers || 12–2 || Wolf (5–6) || Saunders (5–7) ||  || 39,289 || 36–31 || Angel Stadium of Anaheim || L1 || bgcolor="ffbbbb" | −1
|- align="center" bgcolor="#ffbbbb"
| 68 || June 15 || Brewers || 7–1 || Bush (2–5) || Santana (6–5) ||  || 37,484 || 36–32 || Angel Stadium of Anaheim || L2 || bgcolor="ffbbbb" | −2
|- align="center" bgcolor="bbffbb"
| 69 || June 16 || Brewers || 5–1 || Piñeiro (6–6) || Narveson (5–4) ||  || 37,416 || 37–32 || Angel Stadium of Anaheim || W1 || bgcolor="ffbbbb" | −2
|- align="center" bgcolor="bbffbb"
| 70 || June 18 || @ Cubs || 7–6 || Kazmir (7–5) || Silva (8–2) || Rodney (6) || 39,729 || 38–32 || Wrigley Field || W2 || bgcolor="ffbbbb" | −
|- align="center" bgcolor="bbffbb"
| 71 || June 19 || @ Cubs || 12–0 || Weaver (7–3) || Lilly (2–6) ||  || 40,008 || 39–32 || Wrigley Field || W3 || bgcolor="ffbbbb" | −
|- align="center" bgcolor="#ffbbbb"
| 72 || June 20 || @ Cubs || 12–1  || Zambrano (3–5) || Saunders (5–8) ||  || 39,850 || 39–33 || Wrigley Field || L1 || bgcolor="ffbbbb" | −
|- align="center" bgcolor="bbffbb"
| 73 || June 22 || Dodgers || 6–3  || Santana (7–5) || Kershaw (7–4) || Fuentes (11) || 41,595 || 40–33 || Angel Stadium of Anaheim || W1 || bgcolor="ffbbbb" | −
|- align="center" bgcolor="bbffbb"
| 74 || June 23 || Dodgers || 2–1 || Piñeiro (7–6) || Ely (3–5) || Fuentes (12) || 41,001 || 41–33 || Angel Stadium of Anaheim || W2 || bgcolor="ffbbbb" | −
|- align="center" bgcolor="#ffbbbb"
| 75 || June 24 || Dodgers || 10–6 || Jeff Weaver (4–1) || Kazmir (7–6) ||  || 44,043 || 41–34 || Angel Stadium of Anaheim || L1 || bgcolor="ffbbbb" | −
|- align="center" bgcolor="#ffbbbb"
| 76 || June 25 || Rockies || 4–3 (11) || Belisle (3–3) || Rodríguez (0–1) ||  || 37,228 || 41–35 || Angel Stadium of Anaheim || L2 || bgcolor="ffbbbb" | −
|- align="center" bgcolor="bbffbb"
| 77 || June 26 || Rockies || 4–2 || Saunders (6–8) || Cook (2–5) || Fuentes (13) || 39,225 || 42–35 || Angel Stadium of Anaheim || W1 || bgcolor="ffbbbb" | −
|- align="center" bgcolor="bbffbb"
| 78 || June 27 || Rockies || 10–3 || Santana (8–5) || Chacín (4–7) ||  || 37,314 || 43–35 || Angel Stadium of Anaheim || W2 || bgcolor="ffbbbb" | −
|- align="center" bgcolor="bbffbb"
| 79 || June 29 || Rangers || 6–5 || Piñeiro (8–6) || Feldman (5–7) || Fuentes (14) || 38,514 || 44–35 || Angel Stadium of Anaheim || W3 || bgcolor="ffbbbb" | −
|- align="center" bgcolor="#ffbbbb"
| 80 || June 30 || Rangers || 6–4 || Nippert (3–3) || Kazmir (7–7) || Feliz (21) || 41,867 || 44–36 || Angel Stadium of Anaheim || L1 || bgcolor="ffbbbb" | −
|-

|- align="center" bgcolor="bbffbb"
| 81 || July 1 || Rangers || 2–1 || Weaver (8–3) || Wilson (6–4) || Fuentes (15) || 41,162 || 45–36 || Angel Stadium of Anaheim || W1 || bgcolor="ffbbbb" | −
|- align="center" bgcolor="#ffbbbb"
| 82 || July 2 || Royals || 2–1 || Tejeda (3–3) || Shields (0–3) || Soria (21) || 40,005 || 45–37 || Angel Stadium of Anaheim || L1 || bgcolor="ffbbbb" | −
|- align="center" bgcolor="#ffbbbb"
| 83 || July 3 || Royals || 4–2 || Chen (5–2) || Santana (8–6) || Soria (22) || 39,112 || 45–38 || Angel Stadium of Anaheim || L2 || bgcolor="ffbbbb" | −
|- align="center" bgcolor="bbffbb"
| 84 || July 4 || Royals || 11–0 || Piñeiro (9–6) || Larew (1–2) || || 42,116 || 46–38 || Angel Stadium of Anaheim || W1 || bgcolor="ffbbbb" | −
|- align="center" bgcolor="#ffbbbb"
| 85 || July 5 || @ White Sox || 9–2 || Floyd (4–7) || Kazmir (7–8) || Santos (1) || 38,092 || 46–39 || U.S. Cellular Field || L1 || bgcolor="ffbbbb" | −
|- align="center" bgcolor="#ffbbbb"
| 86 || July 6 || @ White Sox || 4–1 || Peña (2–1) || Weaver (8–4) || Jenks (18) || 21,889 || 46–40 || U.S. Cellular Field || L2 || bgcolor="ffbbbb" | −
|- align="center" bgcolor="#ffbbbb"
| 87 || July 7 || @ White Sox || 5–2 || García (9–3) || Saunders (6–9) || Jenks (19) || 21,135 || 46–41 || U.S. Cellular Field || L3 || bgcolor="ffbbbb" | −
|- align="center" bgcolor="#ffbbbb"
| 88 || July 8 || @ White Sox || 1–0 || Danks (8–7) || Santana (8–7) ||  || 27,734 || 46–42 || U.S. Cellular Field || L4 || bgcolor="ffbbbb" | −
|- align="center" bgcolor="bbffbb"
| 89 || July 9 || @ Athletics || 6–5 (10) || Jepsen (1–1) || Bailey (0–3) || Fuentes (16) || 13,156 || 47–42 || Oakland-Alameda Coliseum || W1 || bgcolor="ffbbbb" | −
|- align="center" bgcolor="#ffbbbb"
| 90 || July 10 || @ Athletics || 15–1 || Sheets (4–8) || Kazmir (7–9) ||  || 30,035 || 47–43 || Oakland-Alameda Coliseum || L1 || bgcolor="ffbbbb" | −
|- align="center" bgcolor="#ffbbbb"
| 91 || July 11 || @ Athletics || 5–2 || Cahill (9–3) || Weaver (8–5) || Bailey (18) || 15,164 || 47–44 || Oakland-Alameda Coliseum || L2 || bgcolor="ffbbbb" | −
|- align="center" bgcolor="bbcaff"
|colspan="3" bgcolor="#bbcaff"| July 13: All-Star Game (NL wins—Box) || 3–1 || Capps (WAS) || Hughes (NYY) || Broxton (LAD) || 45,408 || || Angel Stadium of Anaheim || colspan=2 |  Anaheim, CA
|- align="center" bgcolor="bbffbb"
| 92 || July 15 || Mariners || 8–3 || Piñeiro (10–6) || Fister (3–5) ||  || 41,959 || 48–44 || Angel Stadium of Anaheim || W1 || bgcolor="ffbbbb" | −
|- align="center" bgcolor="bbffbb"
| 93 || July 16 || Mariners || 3–2 || Weaver (9–5) || Hernández (7–6) || Fuentes (17) || 41,449 || 49–44 || Angel Stadium of Anaheim || W2 || bgcolor="ffbbbb" | −
|- align="center" bgcolor="bbffbb"
| 94 || July 17 || Mariners || 7–6 || Jepsen (2–1) || Sweeney (1–1) || Fuentes (18) || 42,997 || 50–44 || Angel Stadium of Anaheim || W3 || bgcolor="ffbbbb" | −
|- align="center" bgcolor="ffbbbb"
| 95 || July 18 || Mariners || 2–1 (10) || League (6–6) || Jepsen (2–2) || Aardsma (17) || 38,883 || 50–45 || Angel Stadium of Anaheim || L1 || bgcolor="ffbbbb" | −
|- align="center" bgcolor="bbffbb"
| 96 || July 20 || @ Yankees || 10–2 || O'Sullivan (1–0) || Hughes (11–3) ||  || 47,775 || 51–45 || Yankee Stadium || W1 || bgcolor="ffbbbb" | −5
|- align="center" bgcolor="ffbbbb"
| 97 || July 21 || @ Yankees || 10–6 || Vázquez (8–7) || Piñeiro (10–7) ||  || 47,521 || 51–46 || Yankee Stadium || L1 || bgcolor="ffbbbb" | −5
|- align="center" bgcolor="ffbbbb"
| 98 || July 22 || @ Rangers || 3–2 || Lee (9–4) || Weaver (9–6) || Feliz (26) || 39,876 || 51–47 || Rangers Ballpark in Arlington || L2 || bgcolor="ffbbbb" | −6
|- align="center" bgcolor="ffbbbb"
| 99 || July 23 || @ Rangers || 1–0 || Wilson (9–5) || Saunders (6–10) || Feliz (27) || 46,554 || 51–48 || Rangers Ballpark in Arlington || L3 || bgcolor="ffbbbb" | −7
|- align="center" bgcolor="bbffbb"
| 100 || July 24 || @ Rangers || 6–2 || Santana (9–7) || Feldman (5–9) ||  || 47,098 || 52–48 || Rangers Ballpark in Arlington || W1 || bgcolor="ffbbbb" | −6
|- align="center" bgcolor="ffbbbb"
| 101 || July 25 || @ Rangers || 6–4 || Hunter (8–0) || Bell (1–2) || Feliz (28) || 38,320 || 52–49 || Rangers Ballpark in Arlington || L1 || bgcolor="ffbbbb" | −7
|- align="center" bgcolor="ffbbbb"
| 102 || July 26 || Red Sox || 6–3 || Buchholz (11–5) || Haren (7–9) || Papelbon (23) || 40,364 || 52–50 || Angel Stadium of Anaheim || L2 || bgcolor="ffbbbb" | −
|- align="center" bgcolor="ffbbbb"
| 103 || July 27 || Red Sox || 4–2 || Lackey (10–5) || Weaver (9–7) || Papelbon (24) || 40,120 || 52–51 || Angel Stadium of Anaheim || L3 || bgcolor="ffbbbb" | −
|- align="center" bgcolor="ffbbbb"
| 104 || July 28 || Red Sox || 7–3 || Beckett (2–1) || Rodney (4–1) ||  || 44,052 || 52–52 || Angel Stadium of Anaheim || L4 || bgcolor="ffbbbb" | −
|- align="center" bgcolor="bbffbb"
| 105 || July 30 || Rangers || 9–7 || Santana (10–7) || Hunter (8–1) || Fuentes (19) || 43,024 || 53–52 || Angel Stadium of Anaheim || W1 || bgcolor="ffbbbb" | −8
|- align="center" bgcolor="ffbbbb"
| 106 || July 31 || Rangers || 2–1 || Harden (4–3) || Haren (7–10) || Feliz (29) || 41,011 || 53–53 || Angel Stadium of Anaheim || L1 || bgcolor="ffbbbb" | −9
|-

|- align="center" bgcolor="bbffbb"
| 107 || August 1 || Rangers || 4–1 || Weaver (10–7) || Lee (9–5) || Fuentes (20) || 41,019 || 54–53 || Angel Stadium of Anaheim || W1 || bgcolor="ffbbbb" | −8
|- align="center" bgcolor="ffbbbb"
| 108 || August 3 || @ Orioles || 6–3 || Guthrie (5–11) || Rodríguez (0–2) ||  || 16,723 || 54–54 || Oriole Park at Camden Yards || L1 || bgcolor="ffbbbb" | −8
|- align="center" bgcolor="ffbbbb"
| 109 || August 4 || @ Orioles || 9–7 || Matusz (4–11) || Santana (10–8) || Simón (16) || 13,467 || 54–55 || Oriole Park at Camden Yards || L2 || bgcolor="ffbbbb" | −9
|- align="center" bgcolor="ffbbbb"
| 110 || August 5 || @ Orioles || 5–4 || Berken (3–2) || Rodríguez (0–3) ||  || 17,362 || 54–56 || Oriole Park at Camden Yards || L3 || bgcolor="ffbbbb" | −10
|- align="center" bgcolor="bbffbb"
| 111 || August 6 || @ Tigers || 4–2 || Weaver (11–7) || Verlander (12–7) || Fuentes (21) || 35,106 || 55–56 || Comerica Park || W1 || bgcolor="ffbbbb" | −10
|- align="center" bgcolor="bbffbb"
| 112 || August 7 || @ Tigers || 10–1 || Kazmir (8–9) || Bonderman (6–7) ||  || 38,783 || 56–56 || Comerica Park || W2 || bgcolor="ffbbbb" | −9
|- align="center" bgcolor="ffbbbb"
| 113 || August 8 || @ Tigers || 9–4 || Porcello (5–10) || Bell (1–3) ||  || 32,037 || 56–57 || Comerica Park || L1 || bgcolor="ffbbbb" | −9
|- align="center" bgcolor="bbffbb"
| 114 || August 9 || Royals || 6–4 || Santana (11–8) || O'Sullivan (1–3) || Fuentes (22) || 40,011 || 57–57 || Angel Stadium of Anaheim || W1 || bgcolor="ffbbbb" | −
|- align="center" bgcolor="bbffbb"
| 115 || August 10 || Royals || 3–1 || Haren (8–10) || Bullington (0–2) || Fuentes (23) || 43,512 || 58–57 || Angel Stadium of Anaheim || W2 || bgcolor="ffbbbb" | −
|- align="center" bgcolor="bbffbb"
| 116 || August 11 || Royals || 2–1 (10) || Fuentes (4–1) || Chavez (4–3) ||  || 39,093 || 59–57 || Angel Stadium of Anaheim || W3 || bgcolor="ffbbbb" | −
|- align="center" bgcolor="ffbbbb"
| 117 || August 13 || Blue Jays || 3–0 || Rzepczynski (1–1) || Kazmir (8–10) || Gregg (26) || 40,606 || 59–58 || Angel Stadium of Anaheim || L1 || bgcolor="ffbbbb" | −
|- align="center" bgcolor="bbffbb"
| 118 || August 14 || Blue Jays || 7–2 || Santana (12–8) || Cecil (9–6) ||  || 42,059 || 60–58 || Angel Stadium of Anaheim || W1 || bgcolor="ffbbbb" | −
|- align="center" bgcolor="ffbbbb"
| 119 || August 15 || Blue Jays || 4–1 || Romero (10–7) || Haren (8–11) || Gregg (27) || 38,138 || 60–59 || Angel Stadium of Anaheim || L1 || bgcolor="ffbbbb" | −
|- align="center" bgcolor="ffbbbb"
| 120 || August 17 || @ Red Sox || 6–0 || Buchholz (14–5) || Weaver (11–8) ||  || 38,304 || 60–60 || Fenway Park || L2 || bgcolor="ffbbbb" | −8
|- align="center" bgcolor="ffbbbb"
| 121 || August 18 || @ Red Sox || 7–5 || Lackey (11–7) || Jepsen (2–3) || Papelbon (30) || 37,779 || 60–61 || Fenway Park || L3 || bgcolor="ffbbbb" | −8
|- align="center" bgcolor="bbffbb"
| 122 || August 19 || @ Red Sox || 7–2 || Santana (13–8) || Beckett (3–3) ||  || 37,641 || 61–61 || Fenway Park || W1 || bgcolor="ffbbbb" | −7
|- align="center" bgcolor="ffbbbb"
| 123 || August 20 || @ Twins || 7–2 || Duensing (7–1) || Haren (8–12) ||  || 40,747 || 61–62 || Target Field || L1 || bgcolor="ffbbbb" | −8
|- align="center" bgcolor="bbffbb"
| 124 || August 21 || @ Twins || 9–3 || Rodríguez (1–3) || Slowey (11–6) ||  || 40,966 || 62–62 || Target Field || W1 || bgcolor="ffbbbb" | −7
|- align="center" bgcolor="ffbbbb"
| 125 || August 22 || @ Twins || 4–0 || Baker (11–9) || Weaver (11–9) ||  || 40,385 || 62–63 || Target Field || L1 || bgcolor="ffbbbb" | −8
|- align="center" bgcolor="ffbbbb"
| 126 || August 23 || Rays || 4–3 || Shields (12–11) || Kazmir (8–11) || Soriano (38) || 39,127 || 62–64 || Angel Stadium of Anaheim || L2 || bgcolor="ffbbbb" | −9
|- align="center" bgcolor="ffbbbb"
| 127 || August 24 || Rays || 10–3 || Davis (–) || Santana (13–9) ||  || 43,577 || 62–65 || Angel Stadium of Anaheim || L3 || bgcolor="ffbbbb" | −10
|- align="center" bgcolor="bbffbb"
| 128 || August 25 || Rays || 12–3 || Haren (9–12) || Niemann (10–4) ||  || 37,099 || 63–65 || Angel Stadium of Anaheim || W1 || bgcolor="ffbbbb" | −10
|- align="center" bgcolor="ffbbbb"
| 129 || August 27 || Orioles || 3–1 || Bergesen (6–9) || Bell (1–4) || Uehara (3) || 41,037 || 63–66 || Angel Stadium of Anaheim || L1 || bgcolor="ffbbbb" | −
|- align="center" bgcolor="ffbbbb"
| 130 || August 28 || Orioles || 5–0 || Millwood (3–14) || Kazmir (8–12) ||  || 43,127 || 63–67 || Angel Stadium of Anaheim || L2 || bgcolor="ffbbbb" | −
|- align="center" bgcolor="ffbbbb"
| 131 || August 29 || Orioles || 1–0 || Guthrie (8–13) || Weaver (11–10) || Uehara (4) || 38,232 || 63–68 || Angel Stadium of Anaheim || L3 || bgcolor="ffbbbb" | −
|- align="center" bgcolor="bbffbb"
| 132 || August 30 || @ Mariners || 5–3 || Santana (14–9) || Hernández (2–6) || Rodney (7) || 20,545 || 64–68 || Safeco Field || W1 || bgcolor="ffbbbb" | −
|- align="center" bgcolor="ffbbbb"
| 133 || August 31 || @ Mariners || 3–1 || League (9–6) || Jepsen (2–4) || Aardsma (26) || 18,737 || 64–69 || Safeco Field || L1 || bgcolor="ffbbbb" | −
|-

|- align="center" bgcolor="bbffbb"
| 134 || September 1 || @ Mariners || 4–2 || Bell (2–4) || Vargas (9–8) || Rodney (8) || 17,515 || 65–69 || Safeco Field || W1 || bgcolor="ffbbbb" | − 
|- align="center" bgcolor="ffbbbb"
| 135 || September 3 || @ Athletics || 8–0 || Gonzalez (13–8) || Kazmir (8–13) ||  || 23,401 || 65–70 || Oakland-Alameda Coliseum || L1 || bgcolor="ffbbbb" | − 
|- align="center" bgcolor="ffbbbb"
| 136 || September 4 || @ Athletics || 3–1 || Cahill (15–6) || Weaver (11–11) || Bailey (21) || 14,227 || 65–71 || Oakland-Alameda Coliseum || L2 || bgcolor="ffbbbb" | − 
|- align="center" bgcolor="bbffbb"
| 137 || September 5 || @ Athletics || 7–4 || Santana (15–9) || Mazzaro (6–8) ||  || 16,413 || 66–71 || Oakland-Alameda Coliseum || W1 || bgcolor="ffbbbb" | − 
|- align="center" bgcolor="ffbbbb"
| 138 || September 6 || Indians || 3–2 || Rodney (4–2) || Lewis (4–2) || Perez (19) || 39,107 || 66–72 || Angel Stadium of Anaheim || L1 || bgcolor="ffbbbb" | − 
|- align="center" bgcolor="ffbbbb"
| 139 || September 7 || Indians || 6–1 || Masterson (6–2) || Bell (2–5) ||  || 38,619 || 66–73 || Angel Stadium of Anaheim || L2 || bgcolor="ffbbbb" | − 
|- align="center"  bgcolor="bbffbb"
| 140 || September 8 || Indians || 4–3 (16) || Palmer (1–1) || Ambriz (0–2) ||  || 37,857 || 67–73 || Angel Stadium of Anaheim || W1 || bgcolor="ffbbbb" | −
|- align="center"  bgcolor="bbffbb"
| 141 || September 10 || Mariners || 4–3 (14) || Thompson (1–0) || Sweeney (1–2) ||  || 42,203 || 68–73 || Angel Stadium of Anaheim || W2 || bgcolor="ffbbbb" | −10
|- align="center"  bgcolor="bbffbb"
| 142 || September 11 || Mariners || 7–4 || Santana (16–9) || Hernández (11–11) || Rodney (9) || 39,123 || 69–73 || Angel Stadium of Anaheim || W3 || bgcolor="ffbbbb" | −10
|- align="center"  bgcolor="bbffbb"
| 143 || September 12 || Mariners || 3–0 || Haren (10–12) || Vargas (9–10) || Rodney (10) || 42,357 || 70–73 || Angel Stadium of Anaheim || W4 || bgcolor="ffbbbb" | −10
|- align="center" bgcolor="ffbbbb"
| 144 || September 14 || @ Indians || 4–3 || Tomlin (4–3) || Kazmir (8–14) || Perez (20) || 15,734 || 70–74 || Progressive Field || L1 || bgcolor="ffbbbb" | −11
|- align="center" bgcolor="bbffbb"
| 145 || September 15 || @ Indians || 7–0 || Weaver (12–11) || Gómez (3–4) ||  || 10,183 || 71–74 || Progressive Field || W1 || bgcolor="ffbbbb" | −11
|- align="center" bgcolor="ffbbbb"
| 146 || September 16 || @ Indians || 3–2 (11) || Pérez (5–1) || Cassevah (0–1) ||  || 14,000 || 71–75 || Progressive Field || L1 || bgcolor="ffbbbb" | −
|- align="center" bgcolor="bbffbb"
| 147 || September 17 || @ Rays || 4–3 || Kohn (1–0) || Wheeler (2–4) || Rodney (11) || 23,215 || 72–75 || Tropicana Field || W1 || bgcolor="ffbbbb" | −
|- align="center" bgcolor="ffbbbb"
| 148 || September 18 || @ Rays || 4–3 (10) || Soriano (3–2) || Cassevah (0–2) ||  || 31,896 || 72–76 || Tropicana Field || L1 || bgcolor="ffbbbb" | −
|- align="center" bgcolor="bbffbb"
| 149 || September 19 || @ Rays || 6–3 || Kazmir (9–14) || Niemann (10–7) || Walden (1) || 25,794 || 73–76 || Tropicana Field || W1 || bgcolor="ffbbbb" | −
|- align="center" bgcolor="bbffbb"
| 150 || September 20 || Rangers || 7–4 || Weaver (13–11) || Holland (3–4) || Rodney (12) || 41,404 || 74–76 || Angel Stadium of Anaheim || W2 || bgcolor="ffbbbb" | −
|- align="center" bgcolor="bbffbb"
| 151 || September 21 || Rangers || 2–0 || Santana (17–9) || Lewis (12–12) ||  || 41,707 || 75–76 || Angel Stadium of Anaheim || W3 || bgcolor="ffbbbb" | −
|- align="center" bgcolor="ffbbbb"
| 152 || September 22 || Rangers || 2–1 (12) || Harrison (3–1) || Palmer (1–2) || Feliz (37) || 41,222 || 75–77 || Angel Stadium of Anaheim || L1 || bgcolor="ffbbbb" | −
|- align="center" style="background: #780000; color: white"
| 153 || September 24 || White Sox || 2–1 || Thornton (5–4) || Rodney (4–3) ||  || 41,046 || 75–78 || Angel Stadium of Anaheim || L2 || −10
|- align="center" bgcolor="ffbbbb"
| 154 || September 25 || White Sox || 6–2 || Danks (14–11) || Kazmir (9–15) ||  || 40,758 || 75–79 || Angel Stadium of Anaheim || L3 || bgcolor="ffbbbb" | −11
|- align="center" bgcolor="ffbbbb"
| 155 || September 26 || White Sox || 4–3 || Peña (5–2) || Weaver (13–12) || Thornton (7) || 42,686 || 75–80 || Angel Stadium of Anaheim || L4 || bgcolor="ffbbbb" | −12
|- align="center"  bgcolor="bbffbb"
| 156 || September 27 || Athletics || 6–5 || Kohn (2–0) || Ziegler (3–6) || Rodney (13) || 40,414 || 76–80 || Angel Stadium of Anaheim || W1 || bgcolor="ffbbbb" | −11
|- align="center"  bgcolor="bbffbb"
| 157 || September 28 || Athletics || 4–2 || Haren (11–12) || Braden (10–14) || Rodney (14) || 43,163 || 77–80 || Angel Stadium of Anaheim || W2 || bgcolor="ffbbbb" | −10
|- align="center"  bgcolor="bbffbb"
| 158 || September 29 || Athletics || 2–1 (11) || Cassevah (1–2) || Ziegler (3–7) ||  || 39,199 || 78–80 || Angel Stadium of Anaheim || W3 || bgcolor="ffbbbb" | −10
|- align="center" bgcolor="ffbbbb"
| 159 || September 30 || @ Rangers || 3–2 || O'Day (6–2) || Walden (0–1) || Feliz (39) || 33,228 || 78–81 || Rangers Ballpark in Arlington || W3 || bgcolor="ffbbbb" | −11
|-

|- align="center"  bgcolor="bbffbb"
| 160 || October 1 || @ Rangers || 5–4 (11) || Thompson (2–0) || Harrison (3–2) || Kohn (1) || 43,149 || 79–81 || Rangers Ballpark in Arlington || W1 || bgcolor="ffbbbb" | −10
|- align="center" bgcolor="ffbbbb"
| 161 || October 2 || @ Rangers || 6–2 || Wilson (15–8) || Santana (17–10) || Feliz (40) || 45,895 || 79–82 || Rangers Ballpark in Arlington || L1 || bgcolor="ffbbbb" | −11
|- align="center"  bgcolor="bbffbb"
| 162 || October 3 || @ Rangers || 6–2 || Haren (12–12) || Nippert (4–5) ||  || 45,446 || 80–82 || Rangers Ballpark in Arlington || W1 || bgcolor="ffbbbb" | −10
|-

Regular Season Schedule (calendar style) 
Regular Season Schedule (sortable text)

Record vs. Opponents

Roster

Player stats

Batting
Note: G = Games played; AB = At bats; R = Runs; H = Hits; 2B = Doubles; 3B = Triples; HR = Home runs; RBI = Runs batted in; SB = Stolen bases; BB = Walks; AVG = Batting average; SLG = Slugging average

Source:

Pitching
Note: W = Wins; L = Losses; ERA = Earned run average; G = Games pitched; GS = Games started; SV = Saves; IP = Innings pitched; H = Hits allowed; R = Runs allowed; ER = Earned runs allowed; BB = Walks allowed; SO = Strikeouts

Source:

All Star Game

The 2010 MLB All Star game will be hosted by the Angels in 2010, for the third time in franchise history. The Angels and the city of Anaheim previously hosted the All Star game in 1967 and 1989, both in different stadium configurations (the 2010 All Star game will feature a different stadium configuration than the previous two as well). The game will be an exhibition between the All Stars of the American League managed by Joe Girardi of the 2009 World Series champion New York Yankees and the National League managed by Charlie Manuel of the 2009 National League champion Philadelphia Phillies. The winner of the 2010 All Star Game will determine which league receives home-field advantage for the 2010 World Series.

Farm system

See also

Los Angeles Angels of Anaheim
2010 MLB All-Star Game
Angel Stadium of Anaheim

Other Anaheim–based teams in 2010
Anaheim Ducks (Honda Center)
 2009–10 Anaheim Ducks season
 2010–11 Anaheim Ducks season

References

External links
2010 Los Angeles Angels of Anaheim season at Baseball Reference
2010 Los Angeles Angels of Anaheim Official Site

Los Angeles Angels seasons
Los Angeles Angels of Anaheim
Los